The Karnataka State Film Award for First Best Film is a state film award of the Indian state of Karnataka given during the annual Karnataka State Film Awards. The award honors Kannada language films.

Winners

See also

 Karnataka State Film Award for Second Best Film
 Karnataka State Film Award for Third Best Film
 Cinema of India
 Cinema of Karnataka
 List of Kannada-language films

References

Karnataka State Film Awards
Kannada-language films